St Thomas More Catholic Academy is a mixed secondary school and sixth form located in the Longton area of Stoke-on-Trent in the English county of Staffordshire. The school is named after Saint Thomas More, a sixteenth century elder statesman who was martyred for his refusal to accept King Henry VIII's claim to be the supreme head of the church.

First established in 1980 as a voluntary aided upper school for pupils aged 12 to 18, in 1983 St Thomas More became a secondary school for pupils aged 11 to 18. The school gained a specialism in Maths and Computing in 2004 and became a Training school in 2009. In 2013 the school relocated to a new building and converted to academy status, sponsored by the Roman Catholic Archdiocese of Birmingham.

St Thomas More Catholic Academy offers GCSEs and BTECs as programmes of study for pupils, while students in the sixth form have the option to study from a range of A-levels and further BTECs. The sixth form provision is offered as the Trinity Sixth Form, a collaboration between St Thomas More Catholic Academy, St John Fisher Catholic College, and St Margaret Ward Catholic Academy.

References

External links
St Thomas More Catholic Academy official website

Secondary schools in Stoke-on-Trent
Catholic secondary schools in the Archdiocese of Birmingham
Educational institutions established in 1980
1980 establishments in England
Training schools in England
Academies in Stoke-on-Trent